Antonio "Toni" Muñoz Llompart (born 13 August 1982) is a Spanish former professional footballer who played as a forward.

Career
Muñoz was born in Manacor, Balearic Islands. During his career, spent mostly in the Spanish lower leagues, he played once in La Liga, featuring for RCD Mallorca in a 1–0 home defeat against Deportivo de La Coruña on 28 August 2005. 

Muñoz's other professional season was with Super League Greece club Athlitiki Enosi Larissa, following which he returned to his country in 2008.

Personal life
Toni is the younger brother of another footballer, Xisco.

References

External links

1982 births
Living people
Sportspeople from Manacor
Spanish footballers
Footballers from Mallorca
Association football forwards
La Liga players
Segunda División B players
Tercera División players
Valencia CF Mestalla footballers
CD Logroñés footballers
Novelda CF players
RCD Mallorca B players
RCD Mallorca players
CE Mataró players
Athlitiki Enosi Larissa F.C. players
Spanish expatriate footballers
Expatriate footballers in Greece
Spanish expatriate sportspeople in Greece